Michael George Vellucci (born August 11, 1966) is an American former professional ice hockey player. He is currently an assistant coach of the Pittsburgh Penguins in the National Hockey League. Previously, he was the head coach and general manager of the Wilkes-Barre/Scranton Penguins in the American Hockey League for one season. Prior to that he was head coach of the Charlotte Checkers in the American Hockey League for two seasons winning the Calder Cup in 2018-19. He was also head coach and general manager of the Plymouth Whalers in the Ontario Hockey League for 14 seasons.

Playing career
Vellucci played major junior with the Belleville Bulls of the Ontario Hockey League from 1983 to 1986. During the summer of 1984 he was in a car driven by teammate Al Iafrate when it crashed and flipped multiple times. Vellucci was thrown from the car and broke his back. He missed the entire 1984–85 season as a result.

Selected 131st overall in the 1984 NHL Entry Draft by the Hartford Whalers, Vellucci played professionally in the IHL, AHL, ECHL and BHL from 1986 to 1989. Vellucci appeared in two games in the National Hockey League in 1987–88.

Management career
Vellucci was with the Detroit Compuware Ambassadors of the North American Hockey League (NAHL) from 1994 to 1999, where his teams went 241–82–27 in the regular season and captured U.S. national championships in 1994 and 1999. The Ambassadors also captured two NAHL regular season titles and four Robertson Cups.

Vellucci coached the Plymouth Whalers of the Ontario Hockey League (OHL) from 2001 to 2008, winning the Matt Leyden Trophy as OHL Coach of the Year in 2007 becoming the first American to win. That same season, he led the Whalers to the J. Ross Robertson Cup and a berth in the 2007 Memorial Cup. He was also named the OHL's Coach of the Year and Executive of the Year in 2012–13. Vellucci stepped down as head coach of the Whalers in December 2007, as he wanted more time to concentrate on his general manager duties, and he was replaced by Greg Stefan. Stefan coached the club until November 2008, when he resigned to take a job with the Carolina Hurricanes of the NHL, and Vellucci took over the coaching duties once again.

Vellucci left the Whalers after the 2013–14 season and took a job as an assistant general manager and director of player development with the Carolina Hurricanes of the National Hockey League. After three seasons, he became the head coach of the Hurricanes' American Hockey League (AHL) affiliate, the Charlotte Checkers in 2017. In his second season as the Checkers head coach, Vellucci won 2019 AHL's Coach of the Year award. The Checkers won the 2019 Calder Cup under Vellucci, beating the defending champion Toronto Marlies in the conference finals and the Chicago Wolves in the finals. This was the Checkers' first Calder Cup finals appearance and win.

On June 28, 2019, Vellucci parted ways with the Hurricanes organization. On the same day, he was announced as the head coach of the Wilkes-Barre/Scranton Penguins, the Pittsburgh Penguins' AHL affiliate.

On September 2, 2020, Vellucci was named an assistant coach of the Pittsburgh Penguins.

Personal life
Mike and his wife, Sue, have 2 children, Allison and Ryan. Vellucci's son was drafted by Saginaw Spirit in the OHL and currently plays for the Johnstown Tomahawks.

Career statistics

Regular season and playoffs

Coaching record

AHL

References

External links
 

1966 births
Living people
American men's ice hockey defensemen
Belleville Bulls players
Binghamton Whalers players
Carolina Hurricanes executives
Detroit Falcons (CoHL) players
EHC Lustenau players
Erie Panthers players
Hartford Whalers draft picks
Hartford Whalers players
Ice hockey players from Michigan
Indianapolis Ice players
Milwaukee Admirals (IHL) players
People from Farmington, Michigan
Phoenix Roadrunners (IHL) players
Pittsburgh Penguins coaches
Plymouth Whalers coaches
Salt Lake Golden Eagles (IHL) players
St. Thomas Wildcats players
Whitley Warriors players
Winston-Salem Thunderbirds players